The Shannon Stakes is an Australian Turf Club  Group 2 Thoroughbred quality handicap horse race, for horses aged three years old and older, over a distance of 1500 metres, held annually at Rosehill Racecourse, Sydney, Australia in September. Total prize money for the race is A$250,000.

History

The race is named for the outstanding Australian Hall of Fame horse Shannon, who raced in the 1940s and was sold to US interests and won the Hollywood Gold Cup.

Name
 1978–1997 - Shannon Quality Handicap
 1998 onwards - Shannon Stakes

Grade
 1978–1984 - Principal race
 1985–2000 - Group 3
 2001 onwards - Group 2

Distance
 1978–1990 – 1500 metres
 1991 - 1550 metres
 1992–2000 - 1500 metres
 2001 - 1400 metres
 2002 onwards - 1500 metres

Venue
 1978–1990 - Rosehill Racecourse
 1991 - Canterbury Park Racecourse
 1992 onwards - Rosehill Racecourse

Winners

 2022 - Surf Dancer
 2021 - Yonkers
 2020 - I Am Superman
 2019 - Mister Sea Wolf
 2018 - Noire
 2017 - Washington Heights
 2016 - Moral Victory
 2015 - Vashka
 2014 - Rock Sturdy
 2013 - Rain Drum
 2012 - Rolling Pin
 2011 - King Lionheart
 2010 - Firebolt
 2009 - Drumbeats
 2008 - Musket
 2007 - †race not held
 2006 - Stormhill
 2005 - Lotteria
 2004 - Nips
 2003 - Sportsman
 2002 - Gordo
 2001 - On Type
 2000 - Al Mansour
 1999 - Referral
 1998 - Armed For Action
 1997 - Quick Flick
 1996 - Juggler
 1995 - Sprint By
 1994 - Play Or Pay
 1993 - Soho Square
 1992 - Palatin
 1991 - Deposition
 1990 - Go Bush
 1989 - Cole Diesel
 1988 - Never Quit
 1987 - Never Quit
 1986 - Drawn
 1985 - Double Dandy
 1984 - Eastern Bay
 1983 - Gelsomino
 1982 - Dalmacia
 1981 - Prince Pherozshah
 1980 - Star Dancer
 1979 - Stylee
 1978 - For All Seasons

† Not held because of outbreak of equine influenza

See also
 List of Australian Group races
 Group races

References

Horse races in Australia